Cement Mills is a rural locality in the Goondiwindi Region, Queensland, Australia.

History 
From 1916, Queensland Cement and Lime Company, based in Brisbane, obtained its limestone from the Gore area on the Darling Downs. A mail receiving office called Cementmills was opened at the company's works in about January 1918, being renamed to Cement Mills in March 1918. It was upgraded to a full post office on 20 April 1925. By 1936, the company ceased using limestone from the area in favour of the coral from Moreton Bay.

Gore State School opened on 20 January 1913. It was renamed Maxhill State School in 1927. In 1937 the school building was relocated to the cement mills and renamed Cement Mills State School. The school closed on 21 February 1975. In the 1980s, at the request of residents, the Inglewood Shire Council bought the school building and relocated it for use it as a public hall. Its current location is on Cement Mills Road.

References

External links 

  — shows the cement mill and associated infrastructure in its active period

Goondiwindi Region
Localities in Queensland